The 2022 Season was the Athletes Unlimited Basketball's first in existence. The season was played in Las Vegas and ran from January 26 to February 26. The format in which teams are redrafted each week allows athletes to accumulate points for both individual and team performances, culminating with one individual winner.

Tianna Hawkins became the inaugural Overall Season Winner - finishing with 6,836 points. She also led in many statistical categories. She led the league in rebounds (166) and ranked second in points (357), and owns single-game records for points (43), leaderboard points (790) and field goals (19).

Players

Scoring system
There are multiple ways for players to accumulate points during games to make their way into 1 of the 4 captain spots.

Win Points
Win points are all about the team performance. They accumulate during both individual quarters and overall game wins. Each quarter is worth +50 points and overall games are worth +100 points.
If a quarter is tied, the points roll over to the subsequent quarter.

Game MVPs
After each game, the players and members of The Unlimited Club will vote for players who they feel had standout performances.
These points will be added to the player's individual total. Points will be awarded as follows:
MVP 1: +90 points
MVP 2: +60 points
MVP 3: +30 points

Individual Stats
The final component of points is individual stats. Players will earn points based on their performance:
Assist: +10
Steal: +10
Block: +10
Shooting Foul Drawn: +4
Personal Foul Drawn: +4
Offensive Foul Drawn: +8
Defensive Rebound: +5
Offensive Rebound: +10
Made FT: +10
Made 2: +20
Made 3: +30

Players can also lose points for certain actions, such as committing fouls, turning over the ball or missing a shot:
Shooting Foul Committed: -8
Personal Foul Committed: -8
Offensive Foul Committed: -16
Other Foul Committed: -8
Turnover: -10
Missed FT: -10
Missed 2: -10
Missed 3: -10

Captains
Each week, based on the point system, the top 4 players will draft their teams. They will draft in a snake style system.

Week 1 Captains: Kelsey Mitchell, Mercedes Russell, Odyssey Sims, and DiJonai Carrington
Week 2 Captains: Natasha Cloud, Lexie Brown, Isabelle Harrison, and Mercedes Russell
Week 3 Captains: Tianna Hawkins, Lexie Brown, Natasha Cloud, and Isabelle Harrison
Week 4 Captains: Tianna Hawkins, Natasha Cloud, Isabelle Harrison, and Odyssey Sims
Week 5 Captains: Tianna Hawkins, Natasha Cloud, Isabelle Harrison, and Lexie Brown

Games

Week 1

|-
| rowspan=2 | Wednesday, January 26
| 9:00 p.m.
| style="background: blue; color: white;"|Team Sims
| vs
| style="background: orange; color: white;"|Team Russell
| YouTube
| 71–80
| Taj Cole (21)
| Danni M. McCray (12)
| SimsCole (4)
| Mikiah Herbert Harrigan (2)
|-
| 11:00 p.m.
| style="background: yellow; color: white;"|Team Mitchell
| vs
| style="background: purple; color: white;"|Team Carrington
| CBS Sports Network
| 85–92
| Isabelle Harrison (21)
| McGee-StaffordCarrington (11)
| Natasha Cloud (13)
| HarrisonKuster (2)
|-
| rowspan=2 | Friday, January 28
| 7:00 p.m.
| style="background: purple; color: white;"|Team Carrington
| vs
| style="background: orange; color: white;"|Team Russell
| FS2
| 110-104 (2OT)
| DiJonai Carrington (30)
| RussellLavenderHarrison (10)
| Natasha Cloud (15)
| ManisColeCarter (1)
|-
| 9:30 p.m.
| style="background: blue; color: white;"|Team Sims
| vs
| style="background: yellow; color: white;"|Team Mitchell
| FS2
| 103–108
| Kalani Brown (32)
| Essence Carson (11)
| Odyssey Sims (12)
| Kalani Brown (2)
|-
| rowspan=2 | Saturday, January 29
| 7:00 p.m.
| style="background: purple; color: white;"|Team Carrington
| vs
| style="background: blue; color: white;"|Team Sims
| FS2
| 84-78
| Odyssey Sims (24)
| Mikiah Herbert Harrigan (9)
| Odyssey Sims (8)
| Mikiah Herbert Harrigan (2)
|-
| 9:30 p.m.
| style="background: orange; color: white;"|Team Russell
| vs
| style="background: yellow; color: white;"|Team Mitchell
| YouTube
| 79-71
| Mercedes Russell (20)
| Tianna Hawkins (11)
| ColeBrown (5)
| Danni M McCray (4)

Week 2

|-
| rowspan=2 | Wednesday, February 2
| 6:30 p.m.
| style="background: blue; color: white;"|Team Harrison
| vs
| style="background: orange; color: white;"|Team Brown
| YouTube
| 76-83
| Isabelle Harrison (29)
| Isabelle Harrison (12)
| Lexie Brown (5)
| Imani McGee-Stafford (4)
|-
| 9:00 p.m.
| style="background: yellow; color: white;"|Team Cloud
| vs
| style="background: purple; color: white;"|Team Russell
| Bally Sports
| 105-94
| Natasha Cloud (30)
| RussellGreene (11)
| Natasha Cloud (8)
| Nikki Greene (3)
|-
| rowspan=2 | Friday, February 4
| 7:00 p.m.
| style="background: purple; color: white;"|Team Russell
| vs
| style="background: orange; color: white;"|Team Brown
| FS2
| 98-85
| Tianna Hawkins (38)
| Lexie Brown (10)
| Lexie Brown (8)
| GreeneCarson (1)
|-
| 9:30 p.m.
| style="background: blue; color: white;"|Team Harrison
| vs
| style="background: yellow; color: white;"|Team Cloud
| FS2
| 95-89
| Courtney Williams (30)
| Kalani Brown (11)
| Natasha Cloud (7)
| SimsWilliamsBrownHarrison (1)
|-
| rowspan=2 | Saturday, February 5
| 7:00 p.m.
| style="background: purple; color: white;"|Team Russell
| vs
| style="background: blue; color: white;"|Team Harrison
| FS2
| 74-100
| Mercedes Russell (20)
| RussellLavender (8)
| Courtney Williams (10)
| GreeneJackson (1)
|-
| 10:00 p.m.
| style="background: orange; color: white;"|Team Brown
| vs
| style="background: yellow; color: white;"|Team Cloud
| Bally Sports
| 97-84
| Tianna Hawkins (46)
| CloudHawkins (10)
| Taj Cole (12)
| Tianna Hawkins (3)

Week 3

|-
| rowspan=2 | Wednesday, February 9
| 6:30 p.m.
| style="background: blue; color: white;"|Team Cloud
| vs
| style="background: orange; color: white;"|Team Brown
| YouTube
| 85-80
| DiJonai Carrington (25)
| Kalani Brown (12)
| Natasha Cloud (6)
| Herbert HarriganManisCarsonJantel LavenderCloud (1)
|-
| 9:00 p.m.
| style="background: yellow; color: white;"|Team Hawkins
| vs
| style="background: purple; color: white;"|Team Harrison
| Bally Sports
| 54-79
| Tianna Hawkins (20)
| Nikki Greene (10)
| Courtney Williams (8)
| GreeneRussellHarrisonHawkins (1)
|-
| rowspan=2 | Friday, February 11
| 7:00 p.m.
| style="background: purple; color: white;"|Team Harrison
| vs
| style="background: orange; color: white;"|Team Brown
| FS2
| 86-81
| Isabelle Harrison (25)
| Odyssey Sims (12)
| Courtney Williams (10)
| McGee-StaffordCole (2)
|-
| 9:30 p.m.
| style="background: blue; color: white;"|Team Cloud
| vs
| style="background: yellow; color: white;"|Team Hawkins
| FS2
| 70-90
| Tianna Hawkins (28)
| Drew Edelman (14)
| Sydney Colson (9)
| EdelmanHawkins (2)
|-
| rowspan=2 | Saturday, February 12
| 7:30 p.m.
| style="background: purple; color: white;"|Team Harrison
| vs
| style="background: blue; color: white;"|Team Cloud
| FS2
| 85-79
| Odyssey Sims (32)
| Courtney Williams (12)
| Natasha Cloud (10)
| Courtney Williams (2)
|-
| 10:30 p.m.
| style="background: orange; color: white;"|Team Brown
| vs
| style="background: yellow; color: white;"|Team Hawkins
| Bally Sports
| 90-104
| Tianna Hawkins (32)
| Tianna Hawkins (14)
| Sydney Colson (9)
| HawkinsLavenderMcGee-StaffordJackson (1)

Week 4

|-
| rowspan=2 | Wednesday, February 16
| 6:30 p.m.
| style="background: blue; color: white;"|Team Cloud
| vs
| style="background: orange; color: white;"|Team Harrison
| YouTube
| 87-85
| Natasha Cloud (27)
| DiJonai Carrington (11)
| Isabelle Harrison (8)
| McGee-StaffordLavender (2)
|-
| 9:00 p.m.
| style="background: yellow; color: white;"|Team Hawkins
| vs
| style="background: purple; color: white;"|Team Sims
| Bally Sports Network
| 86-76
| Kelsey Mitchell (32)
| HawkinsWalker (11)
| ColsonSims (8)
| Nikki Greene (2)
|-
| rowspan=2 | Friday, February 18
| 7:00 p.m.
| style="background: purple; color: white;"|Team Sims
| vs
| style="background: orange; color: white;"|Team Harrison
| Bally Sports Network
| 87-71
| Taj Cole (26)
| KusterHarrison (11)
| ColeWilliams (5)
| Herbert HarriganHarrison (3)
|-
| 11:30 p.m.
| style="background: blue; color: white;"|Team Cloud
| vs
| style="background: yellow; color: white;"|Team Hawkins
| CBS Sports Network
| 110-113
| DiJonai Carrington (41)
| CarringtonHawkins (14)
| Natasha Cloud (8)
| Kalani Brown (4)
|-
| rowspan=2 | Saturday, February 19
| 7:00 p.m.
|  style="background: purple; color: white;"|Team Sims
| vs
| style="background: blue; color: white;"|Team Cloud
| FS2
| 81-91
| SimsCarrington (28)
| ManisCarrington (11)
| Courtney Williams (10)
| Laurin Mincy (4)
|-
| 9:30 p.m.
| style="background: orange; color: white;"|Team Harrison
| vs
| style="background: yellow; color: white;"|Team Hawkins
| FS2
| 100-93
| Tianna Hawkins (29)
| Tianna Hawkins (12)
| Sydney Colson (13)
| HawkinsJantel Lavender (1)

Week 5

|-
| rowspan=2 | Wednesday, February 23
| 9:00 p.m.
| style="background: blue; color: white;"|Team Harrison
| vs
| style="background: orange; color: white;"|Team Cloud
| Bally Sports Network
| 78-88
| SimsDiJonai Carrington (22)
| Imani McGee-Stafford (15)
| Natasha Cloud (9)
| McGee-StaffordHerbert Harrigan (1) 
|-
| 11:30 p.m.
| style="background: yellow; color: white;"|Team Hawkins
| vs
| style="background: purple; color: white;"|Team Brown
| CBS Sports Network
| 80-70
| Kalani Brown (22)
| Tianna Hawkins (14)
| Taj Cole (8)
| Kalani Brown (3)
|-
| rowspan=2 | Friday, February 25
| 7:00 p.m.
| style="background: purple; color: white;"|Team Brown
| vs
| style="background: orange; color: white;"|Team Cloud
| FS2
| 97-88
| Natasha Cloud (31)
| Kalani Brown (16)
| Taj Cole (8)
| Kalani Brown (4)
|-
| 9:30 p.m.
| style="background: blue; color: white;"|Team Harrison
| vs
| style="background: yellow; color: white;"|Team Hawkins
| FS2
| 74-85
| Isabelle Harrison (28)
| Tianna Hawkins (13)
| Sydney Colson (10)
| Nikki Greene (3)
|-
| rowspan=2 | Saturday, February 26
| 7:00 p.m.
|  style="background: purple; color: white;"|Team Brown
| vs
| style="background: blue; color: white;"|Team Harrison
| FS2
| 103-90
| Odyssey Sims (30)
| Kalani Brown (10)
| ColeWilliams (9)
| Herbert HarriganGreeneKusterBrown (10
|-
| 10:00 p.m.
| style="background: orange; color: white;"|Team Cloud
| vs
| style="background: yellow; color: white;"|Team Hawkins
| Bally Sports Network
| 111-116 (3OT)
| Tianna Hawkins (35)
| Tianna Hawkins (18)
| Natasha Cloud (19)
| ManisCarrington (1)

Leaderboard
Below is the leaderboard which tallies the total points earned via the scoring system that each player has accumulated during the games that are played each week. The points are on a running-tally from week to week. 
The list reflects the final standings - culminating after Week 5.

Team Captain Records

References

2021–22 in American basketball
Basketball in Las Vegas